Andrea Bruno Mazzocato (born 1 September 1948 in San Trovaso) is an Italian Roman Catholic prelate. He was ordained to the priesthood in 1972. From 2000 to 2003 he was bishop of Adria-Rovigo and from 2003 until 2009 served as the Bishop of Treviso. In 2009, Mazzocato became the Archbishop of Udine.

References
 Catholic Hierarchy

Italian Roman Catholic archbishops
1948 births
Living people
Bishops in Friuli-Venezia Giulia